Nipponapterocis is a genus of tree-fungus beetles in the family Ciidae.

Species
 Nipponapterocis brevis Miyatake, 1954
 Nipponapterocis hirsutus Kawanabe, 1995
 Nipponapterocis inermis Kawanabe, 1995

References

Ciidae genera